The Best Song Written and/or Recorded for Television award is annually given by the Guild of Music Supervisors to honor the recording of a song, created directly for a television production. It was first given at their sixth annual awards function, and has continued to be ever since.

Winners and Nominees

2010s

2020s

References

Songwriting awards